Haris Hyseni (born 14 September 1992) is a German-Kosovar footballer who plays as a forward for Phönix Lübeck.

Club career
Hyseni joined the reserve side of Eintracht Braunschweig in the Regionalliga Nord in 2014 from SV Eichede. On the 29th matchday of the 2014–15 2. Bundesliga season, he made his professional debut for Eintracht's senior side, coming on in the 59th minute in a match against VfR Aalen.

During the winter break of the 2015–16 season, Hyseni transferred to SSV Jahn Regensburg. On 28 June 2017, he extended his contract with Regensburg and was loaned out to SV Meppen until the end of the 2017–18 season. In summer 2019, he joined SSV Ulm 1846.

References

External links
 

1992 births
Living people
Sportspeople from Mitrovica, Kosovo
Association football forwards
German footballers
Kosovan footballers
2. Bundesliga players
3. Liga players
Regionalliga players
SV Eichede players
VfR Neumünster players
VfB Lübeck players
Eintracht Braunschweig II players
Eintracht Braunschweig players
SSV Jahn Regensburg players
SV Meppen players
SSV Ulm 1846 players
1. FC Phönix Lübeck players